CKUN-FM is a First Nations/community radio station broadcasting at 101.3 FM in Christian Island, Ontario, Canada. The station began broadcasting in 2002 and is owned by Chimnissing Communications.

External links
www.chimnissing.ca
 
 Decision CRTC 2000-88

Kun
Kun
2002 establishments in Ontario
Radio stations established in 2002